Elizabeth Pennington (1732–1759) was an English poet. Born in Huntingdon, Cambridgeshire, she formed an early friendship with the fellow poet Martha Ferrar, a life-long friend who was the chief beneficiary of her will. During her life she formed friendships with Frances Sheridan and Samuel Richardson, and was praised by John Duncombe in his poetic roll call of women writers, The Feminiad (1754). The poems Dunton was familiar with must have circulated in manuscript. Her three poems that survive were posthumously published: 'Ode to a Thrush', 'Ode to Morning' and 'The Copper Farthing'. All three became anthology pieces, and were published in collections such as Specimens of British Poetesses (1798) and Poems of Eminent Ladies (1780).

Her poetry makes effective use of the burlesque mode, and shows the influence of John Philips's The Splendid Shilling. Her entry in the Oxford Dictionary of National Biography notes that her 'ability to write in a learned and heroic style, despite her limited opportunity for education, is remarkable'.

References

External links 
 Ode to a Thrush
 The Copper Farthing
 The Splendid Shilling

1732 births
1759 deaths
English women poets
18th-century British women writers
18th-century English poets
18th-century English women
18th-century English people